South Armidale United Football Club is a football club based in Armidale, Australia.

It has a long running rivalry with East Armidale and Norths Utd, the former due to the circumstances surrounding its formation and that latter due to some on-field incidents in the mid 1990s. The Club's song is "Yellow" by Coldplay, and its victory song is a reworded version of the Beatles classic, "Yellow Submarine."

History
The club was founded in 1994 by a group of disaffected members of the East Armidale Football Club.

The Club is supported by The Royal Hotel Armidale and New England Toyota and continues to enjoy strong community support from local businesses.

In the first year of its inception it reached the Grand Final of the Armidale & District Football Association (ADFA). Since that time the Club has secured minor premierships in the regional competition, the Northern Inland Premier League, and won the Reserve Grade major premiership on two occasions. It won its way through to the Grand Final of the Northern Inland Premier League in 2014, ultimately losing to Oxley Vale Attunga FC (Tamworth) in the final.

The Club won the Northern Inland Football Cup on 4 May 2015, defeating Tamworth side, North Companions FC following a penalty shootout.

South Armidale Utd FC featured in the Northern NSW Football playoffs in the 2015 FFA Cup, after defeating the Football Mid North Coast Cup Champions, Forster Tuncurry Tigers FC, 2-1 in Tuncurry.

Broadmeadow Magic FC defeated South Armidale 7-1 at the Lake Macquarie Football Facility on 20 June 2015, ending the Scorpions' FFA Cup run. The Scorpions trailed 3–1 at half-time with Cody Watts scoring for the Yellow and Green from the penalty spot.

Current squad
As of 5 May 2021

Achievements
 Northern Inland Premier League Grand Final: Runners-up – 2005, 2014
 Northern Inland Premier League Minor Premiers: Winners – 2005
 Northern Inland Premier League Reserves Grand Final: Winners – 2002, 2013
 Mann Cup: Winners – 2007
 Northern Inland Football Cup: Winners – 2015
 East Armidale FC & South Armidale Utd FC Annual Charity Shield: Winners – 2015
 FFA Cup: Sixth Round – 2015
 Sport UNE Football League 1st Division: Winners - 2020
 Sport UNE Football League 2nd Division: Winners - 2020
 Most handsome squad 2020
 Tom Campbell played for jets
 bagged dk the dogs
 Won the comp, despite Reece Burton playing up front

References

Association football clubs established in 1994
1994 establishments in Australia
Soccer clubs in New South Wales
Armidale